Simone van de Kraats is a Dutch water polo player. She competed in the 2020 Summer Olympics and became the topscorer of the tournament with 28 goals in 7 matches.

References

2000 births
Living people
Dutch female water polo players
Water polo players at the 2020 Summer Olympics
Olympic water polo players of the Netherlands
21st-century Dutch women